The 2003 Letran Knights men's basketball team represented Colegio de San Juan de Letran in the 79th season of the National Collegiate Athletic Association in the Philippines. The men's basketball tournament for the school year 2003-04 began on June 28, 2003, and the host school for the season was San Sebastian College – Recoletos.

The Knights finished the double round-robin eliminations at first place with 9 wins against 5 losses. They then eliminated the Mapúa Cardinals in the Final Four to advance in the finals and faced the hosts and two-time defending champions San Sebastian Stags.

The Knights went on to defeat the Stags in three games to capture their 15th NCAA championship, ending their three-year title drought. Ronjay Enrile was named Finals Most Valuable Player and member of the Mythical Five.

Roster 

 Depth chart Depth chart

NCAA Season 79 games results 

Elimination games were played in a double round-robin format. All games were aired on Studio 23.

Source: ABS-CBN Pinoy Central

Awards

Injuries 
Letran forward Aaron Aban suffered a deep cut on his left knee when he slammed into a rolltec advertising streamer during a match against CSB Blazers in the first round. Aban underwent surgery and needed a month to recuperate.

References 

Letran Knights basketball team seasons